Gordon F. Paschka (March 6, 1920 – c. June 9, 1964) was an American football fullback in the National Football League for the New York Giants and the Phil/Pitt "Steagles", a merger of the Philadelphia Eagles and Pittsburgh Steelers in 1943 due to players serving in World War II. Born in Chaska, Minnesota, he played college football at the University of Minnesota and was drafted in the fourth round of the 1942 NFL Draft. He went missing after a fishing trip on Rainy Lake on June 9, 1964.

References

External links

Pro Football Reference
Notice of Gordon Paschka's disappearance

1920 births
1964 deaths
American football fullbacks
Steagles players and personnel
New York Giants players
People from Chaska, Minnesota
Players of American football from Minnesota
Boating accident deaths
Accidental deaths in Ontario
Philadelphia Eagles players